Viva S Club is the fourth and final series in the BBC television series starring British pop group S Club. This is the only series that is not filmed in America, instead, it is filmed in Barcelona, Spain. The programme is shown every week on CBBC from 20 September 2002 to 27 December 2002 and stars all members of S Club. The show also features Alícia González Laá, as housekeeper Maria, and Jeremy Xido, as Lyall, their mentor from the record company of which the group are signed.

The series aires in the United States, once again changing its name. However, in a break from the previous "S Club 7 in ..." pattern, the show is simply called "S Club" on the title screen, however referred to as "S Club 7 in Barcelona" in promos and commercials. It aires on ABC Family from 21 September 2002 to 14 December 2002.

The series sees Paul Cattermole leave the group. This mirrors real life events, when in March 2002, Paul announces that he is to leave S Club. There is one post series event, a movie titled Seeing Double.

Plot
As with past series, Viva S Club takes place following the events in Hollywood 7, in which the band has become popular Stateside, but not so much internationally. The series sees band member Paul Cattermole leave the group, featuring in only five episodes. The remainder of the series featured the events of the remaining S Club members who had renamed, S Club. The series sees the group gaining new manager Mr Wendelbaum, who employs Lyall and Maria as their mentor and housekeeper.

The final episode titled Let's Get Out of Here, somewhat made fun of the way their series ended, the plot of the finale centred on Tina and a recent break up with a boyfriend whose dad happens to be a Mafioso leader. In the midst of the episode the group reminisce over the past few years and in the end they jump on a boat that was heading to Egypt before Jo pilots the boat back to the United Kingdom.

Cast

Main
 Tina Barrett as Tina
 Paul Cattermole as Paul (first 5 episodes)
 Jon Lee as Jon
 Bradley McIntosh as Bradley
 Jo O'Meara as Jo
 Hannah Spearritt as Hannah
 Rachel Stevens as Rachel
 Jeremy Xido as Lyall Robinson
 Alícia González Laá as Maria

Recurring
 Montse Mostaza as Consuela

Episodes

Home media
Unlike the previous three series, Viva S Club was never released on VHS or DVD worldwide. It has, however, been repeated several times on the CBBC Channel.

References

External links 
 

S Club 7 television series
2000s British children's television series
2002 British television series debuts
2002 British television series endings
ABC Family original programming
Television series by Disney–ABC Domestic Television
BBC children's television shows
British children's musical television series
Television shows set in Spain
Television shows set in Barcelona
Television series based on singers and musicians